Eettillam is 1983 Malayalam film written and directed by Fazil, starring Nedumudi Venu, Mammootty, Bharath Gopi, Menaka, Jalaja and Kalaranjini in the lead roles. The film stars Nedumudi Venu, Menaka, Mammootty and Bharath Gopi in lead roles. The film had musical score by A. T. Ummer.

Plot

Abida lives a poor life with her grandfather Moitheen. She meets a man and starts to believe that her life would change but she isn't aware of the secrets that man is hiding from her.

Cast
 Nedumudi Venu as Vijayan
 Bharath Gopi as Moitheen Bava
 Mammootty as Sivan
 Menaka as Abida
 Jalaja as Kusumam
 Kalaranjini as Kausalya
 Bahadoor as Vasu
 Alummoodan as Kochappi
 Azeez as Vijayan's father

References

External links
 
 Eettillam at the Malayalam Movie Database

1980s Malayalam-language films
Films scored by A. T. Ummer
Films directed by Fazil